Great Plains Software was an accounting software company located in Fargo, North Dakota, whose products focused on small to medium-sized businesses.  It was founded in 1981, went public in 1997, and was purchased by Microsoft in 2001 for $1.1 billion.  Prior to its acquisition, it had 2,200 employees. Its products continue to be offered as Microsoft Dynamics GP.

References

External links 

1981 establishments in the United States